A list of films produced by the Bollywood film industry based in Mumbai in 1942:

Highest-grossing films
The five highest-grossing films at the Indian Box Office in 1942:

A-C

D-J

K-M

N-R

S

T-Z

References

External links
 Bollywood films of 1942 at the Internet Movie Database
Listen to songs from Bollywood films of 1942

1942
Bollywood
Films, Bollywood